Laguna (Italian and Spanish for lagoon) may refer to:

People
 Abe Laguna (born 1992), American DJ known as Ookay
 Andrés Laguna (1499–1559), Spanish physician, pharmacologist, and botanist
 Ana Laguna (born 1955), Spanish-Swedish ballet dancer, court dancer and professor
 Benjamín Máximo Laguna y Villanueva (1822–1902), Spanish forester
 Frederica de Laguna (1906–2004), American anthropologist
 Fábio Laguna (born 1977), Brazilian keyboardist
 Grace de Laguna (1878–1978), American philosopher
 Ieva Lagūna (born 1990), Latvian model
 Jorge Laguna (born 1993), Mexican footballer
 José Dapena Laguna (1912–1991), Puerto Rican politician - mayor of Ponce, Puerto Rico
 José Durand Laguna (1889–1958), Argentine football manager
 Justo Oscar Laguna (1929–2011), Argentinian bishop
 Kenny Laguna (born 1948), American songwriter and record producer
 Ricardo Laguna (born 1982), Mexican-American professional BMX rider and television personality
 Theodore de Laguna (1876-1930), American philosopher

Places

United States

Arizona
 Laguna, Yuma County, Arizona
 Laguna Army Airfield, a military airport in Arizona

California
 Laguna, California (disambiguation)
 Laguna Canyon, a canyon that runs through the San Joaquin Hills in southern Orange County, California
 Laguna Creek, Elk Grove, California, a former census-designated place in Sacramento County
 Laguna Hills, California, a small inland city in Orange County
 Laguna Mountains, a mountain range in San Diego County, California
 Laguna Niguel, California, a city in Orange County

New Mexico
 Laguna, New Mexico, also the location of Mission San José de la Laguna or "Old Laguna"

Texas
 Laguna, former name of Satin, Texas, United States

Elsewhere
 Laguna, New South Wales, a village in New South Wales, Australia
 Laguna, Santa Catarina, a city in Santa Catarina, Brazil
 Laguna City, a private-housing estate in Kowloon, Hong Kong
 Laguna (province), in the Calabarzon region in Luzon, Philippines
 Laguna, Cagdianao, a barangay in the province of Dinagat Islands, Philippines

Other uses
 C.F. Laguna, a football club in Torreón, Coahuila, Mexico
 Chevrolet Chevelle Laguna, an automobile model from 1973 to 1976
 GP Laguna, a cycle race in Croatia
 Large Apparatus studying Grand Unification and Neutrino Astrophysics (LAGUNA), a neutrino observatory
 Laguna Copperplate Inscription, an archeological find in the Philippines
 Laguna F.C., a football team in Gibraltar
 Laguna Loire, a character in the video game Final Fantasy VIII
 Laguna (Madrid Metro), a station on Line 6 of the Madrid Metro
 Laguna Pueblo, a Native American people of the southwestern United States
 Laguna Resources, an Australian mining company
 Renault Laguna, a large family car manufactured by Renault from 1994 to 2015
 Laguna (publisher), Serbian book publishing company
 Laguna Sunrise, Song written by Black Sabbath, album Vol 4, 1972

See also
 La Laguna (disambiguation)
 Laguna Beach (disambiguation)
 Laguna Blanca (disambiguation)
 Laguna Creek (disambiguation)
 Laguna Seca (disambiguation)
 Laguna Verde (disambiguation)
 Lagunas (disambiguation)
 Lagunitas (disambiguation)